Cheremkhiv is a village in Kolomyia Raion in Ivano-Frankivsk Oblast (province) of Ukraine. It was a town in the Kolomyia Administrative District of Galicia. It belongs to Korshiv rural hromada, one of the hromadas of Ukraine. The settlement was founded in 1437. Population is 1,500 (2001).

References

External links
Towns Of Galicia Kolomea Administrative District
Restructured Kolomea Administrative District while under Polish rule, Circa 1918-1945

Villages in Kolomyia Raion
Shtetls